Alfred Lichtenstein (23 August 1889 – 25 September 1914) was a German expressionist writer.

From a Jewish family, Lichtenstein grew up in Berlin as the son of a manufacturer. He studied law in Erlangen. His was first noticed after publishing poems and short stories in a grotesque style, which invited comparison with a friend of his, Jakob van Hoddis.

Indeed, there were claims of imitation: while Hoddis created the style, Lichtenstein has enlarged it, it was said. Lichtenstein played with this reputation by writing a short story, called "The Winner", which describes in a scurillous way the random friendship of two young men, wherein one falls victim to the other. By using false names he often made fun of real people from the Berlin literary scene, including himself as Kuno Kohn, a silent shy boy; in "The Winner" a virile van Hoddis kills Kuno Kohn at the end of the story.

Lichtenstein admired the style of the French Symbolist poet Alfred Jarry and not only for his ironic writings. Like Jarry, Lichtenstein rode his bicycle through the town. However he was not to grow old: in 1914, he fell at the front in World War I.

References

External links
 
 
 
 
 
 

1889 births
1914 deaths
German Jewish military personnel of World War I
Jewish poets
Writers from Berlin
German Expressionist writers
German military personnel killed in World War I
People from Wilmersdorf
Military personnel of Bavaria
German male poets
20th-century German poets
20th-century German male writers